Lahar is a city and a Nagar Palika in Bhind district in the Indian state of Madhya Pradesh.

Geography
It has an average elevation of 275 metres (902 feet). Sports facilities in Lahar including a cricket stadium named after Indira Gandhi.

History
The history of Lahar can be traced back to the Mahabharat era. It is said that the famous Lakchhagrih, (a palace built up of Lac, which is a highly inflammable material), was built by the Kauravas for Pandavas at the end of their exile. As the legend goes, Kaurav wanted to kill Pandavas by burning them inside the Lakchhagrih. One can still find the pieces of charred lakh in the outskirts of town.

Transport
Nearest Railway Stations are Gwalior(110 km.), Bhind(60 km.) and Jhansi(110 km.). Recently it is connected to the state highway.

Demographics 
According to the 2001 India census, Lahar had a population of 28,253. Males constitute 54% of the population and females 46%. Lahar has an average literacy rate of 61%, higher than the national average of 59.5%: male literacy is 70%, and female literacy is 50%. In Lahar, 17% of the population is under 6 years of age

As of the 2011 Census of India, Lahar has a total population of 214,048 with 116,027 males and 98,021 females. The male literacy rate rose to 72.38% and the female literacy rate rose to 51.45%.

Politics 
 1951: Har Sewak, Indian National Congress / Gokul Prasad, Indian National Congress

As a constituency of Madhya Pradesh:

 1962: Prabhudayal, Indian National Congress
 1977: Ram Shankar Singh, Janata Party
 1980: Ram Shankar Chowdhary, Indian National Congress(I)
 1985: Mathura Prasad Mahant, Bharatiya Janata Party
 1990: Dr.Govind Singh, Janata Dal
 1993: Dr.Govind Singh, Indian National Congress
 1998: Dr.Govind Singh, Indian National Congress
 2003: Dr.Govind Singh, Indian National Congress
 2008: Dr.Govind Singh, Indian National Congress
 2013: Dr.Govind Singh, Indian National Congress
 2018: Dr.Govind Singh, Indian National Congress

References 

 Madhya Pradesh Legislative Assembly

Cities and towns in Bhind district